Bethioua (Berber language: Ibeṭṭiwen, formerly Arzew, under French rule, called Vieil Arzew then Saint Leu) is a town and region in the wilaya of Oran in the west of  Algeria. It has a gas port, petrochemical facilities and desalination plant.

It is located on the ruins of the ancient Roman settlement of Portus Magnus. The region itself belonged to the Battiwa (Ibeṭṭiwen), a group of Berber clans which arrived from the Rif mountains, mainly Ait Said and Temsaman tribe. They were composed of clans from  Zegzawa (Izegzawen), the Ait Mait and their Maraboutic leader Sidi Amar Ben Ahmed whose mausolée lies facing the sea..Thus originally settled in Mazagran near the city of Mostaganem, when in 1784 was given to them by the bey of Mascara this coastal territory of Bethioua a little further west. During the French colonization, Bettiouas had to take refuge in Mazagran once again, most of them were given back their land by the authorities. Today only elders can still really speak the tribe language.

When the Anglo-Americans invaded Algeria in November 1941 (Operation Torch), the American troops who captured Oran landed at Beach Z, which was the strip of coastline between Arzew and Bethioua.

References

Bibliography 
 Metzmacher, M. (1979 a). Les oiseaux de la Macta et de sa région (Algérie) : Non passereaux. Aves, 3-4 : 89–123.

Populated places in Oran Province
Mediterranean port cities and towns in Algeria